Naiara Florencia Ferrari Gómez (born 24 June 1998) is a Uruguayan footballer who plays as a midfielder for Club Nacional de Football and the Uruguay women's national team.

Club career
In 2015, Ferrari moved from Universidad ROU to Nacional.

International career
Ferrari capped for Uruguay during the 2018 Copa América Femenina.

References 

1998 births
Living people
Footballers from Montevideo
Uruguayan women's footballers
Women's association football midfielders
Club Nacional de Football players
Uruguay women's international footballers